Ed Bacon may refer to:

 Ed Bacon (Episcopal priest) (born 1948), American priest in the Diocese of Los Angeles
 Edmund Bacon (architect) (1910–2005), American urban planner, architect, educator and author
 Edwin Monroe Bacon (1844–1916), American writer and editor

See also
Edward Bacon (disambiguation)
Edmund Bacon (disambiguation)